The Missing Album is the third album by the English-Irish folk rock band, The Noel Redding Band, released in 1995 after their break up.

Reception

Greg Prato's review in allmusic said little about the album's content, noting only that it is easily distinguishable from the work of other bands that Noel Redding had worked with. Prato concluded with a prediction that "only the most extreme Noel Redding fans will be curious to give The Missing Album a spin".

Track listing

Personnel

The Noel Redding Band
Noel Redding – bass guitar, vocals, guitar, production, liner notes
David Clarke – vocals, keyboards, piano, organ, clavinet, liner notes
Eric Bell – guitar, vocals
Les Sampson – drums, percussion

Additional musicians
Andy Kealey – vocals
Robbie Walsh – guitar
Stanley Schnier – bass guitar
Don Michael Young – keyboards, piano, organ, clavinet, Moog synthesizers

Additional personnel
Doctor – production
Muff Winwood – production
Phil Ault – engineering
Mike Day – engineering
Dave Hunt – engineering
Steve Marriott – engineering

References

External links

1995 albums
The Noel Redding Band albums